South Vermillion High School is a public high school in Clinton, Indiana serving students in grades 9 through 12. It was created in 1977 as the building replaced Clinton High School. As of 2017, the school has an enrollment of approximately 546 students. SVHS is one of two high schools in Vermillion County (the other being North Vermillion High School in Cayuga). South Vermillion High School is also the only secondary institution under the administration of the South Vermillion School Corporation.

Campus
The school is located on the north side of Clinton. South Vermillion's football field is named after its coach Brent Anderson. Also its softball and baseball field is located next to the stadium. SVHS Gym has a Capacity of 2,900.

Curriculum
The Wildcats have a spell bowl team, a math bowl team, and many other academic teams. Their spell bowl team has been to state on several occasions most recently in the 2015-16 school year. Their Quiz Bowl won the final W.I.C competition on Feb. 2nd, 2016. South Vermillion Also offers a variety of AP classes, and duel credit classes.

Athletics
South Vermillion participates in sports under IHSAA regulations and in IHSAA state rankings and tournaments. It is a member of the Wabash River Conference.

Fall
Boys Cross Country
Girls Cross Country
Football
Girls Golf
Boys Soccer
Girls Soccer
Boys Tennis
Volleyball

Winter
Boys Basketball
Girls Basketball
Boys Swimming
Girls Swimming
Wrestling

Spring
Baseball
Boys Golf
Softball
Girls Tennis
Boys Track and Field
Girls Track and Field

There are also the club sports (non-IHSAA) of cheerleading, dance, boys and girls bowling, and marching band.

South Vermillion Wildcat Football

On October 4, 2013 South Vermillion's football field was named after its coach Brent Anderson. The ceremony commenced with alumni who played for Anderson and the presentation of a memorial at the field.

The South Vermillion Wildcat football team represents South Vermillion High School  in the 2A division of IHSAA football. South Vermillion plays its home games at Brent Anderson Memorial Stadium on the campus of South Vermillion High School in Clinton, Indiana. The Wildcats compete in the Wabash River Conference. Prior to realignment in 2016, South Vermillion was part of the Western Indiana Conference but moved to the WRC in 2016 due to travel costs.

The Wildcats have registered 7 winning seasons in their history, with 2 of those seasons resulting in eight victories or more, and 12 seasons resulting in at least five wins. The Wildcats have won 2 conference championships in their history.

Trophy games

Bronze Helmet Game
The Bronze Helmet game is played annually between the Sullivan Golden Arrows and the Wildcats. The winner has been awarded the Bronze Helmet since 1946.

Coal Bucket Game
The Coal Bucket game is played annually between the Northview Knights and the Wildcats, and the winner receives the old coal bucket. Originally started between the Clinton Wildcats and the Brazil Red Devils, the game has continued after Brazil consolidated into Northview. The winner has received the same coal bucket as a trophy for the game since 1951.

Milk Jug Game
The Milk Jug game is played annually between the Riverton Parke Panthers and the Wildcats, and the winner receives the Milk Jug. The Milk Jug game started in 1993, with Riverton Park taking the Trophy 22–6. The game resumed after the Wildcats re-entered the Wabash River Conference in 2016.

1993 Riverton Parke 22–6
1994 Riverton Parke 27–7
1995 South Vermillion 13–10
1996 Riverton Parke 42–13
1997 South Vermillion 21–20
1998 South Vermillion 52–7
2016 South Vermillion 48–20
2017 South Vermillion 31-6
2018 South Vermillion 28-0
2019 South Vermillion 35-8
2020 South Vermillion 54-0
2021 No Game COVID-19
2022 South Vermillion 38-0

Head coaches

Record vs Rivals

 Name Changed due to Rockville and Turkey Run consolidation.

Conference Championships
South Vermillion has won or shared a conference championship on 3 occasions, including  2 Western Indiana Conference titles and most recently the 2017 Wabash River Conference Title.

Team Records

All-State Players
A total of 8 Wildcats have been recognized as All-State by various media selectors.

Basketball
The South Vermillion Wildcats have won (1) Sectional 1986.

Battle Of the Back-Roads

The Battle Of The Back-Roads game is played annually between the Riverton Parke Panthers and the Wildcats, the winner receiving a large gold basketball on a square wooden base.
On Feb 15, 2013, the inaugural battle of the back-roads trophy was won by the Wildcat's, they beat Riverton Parke 73-55
The Trophy series is SV 3-1 RP

Former Schools

See also
 List of high schools in Indiana Western Indiana Conference

References

External links
 South Vermillion High School's Website
 School Data

Public high schools in Indiana
Education in Vermillion County, Indiana
Buildings and structures in Vermillion County, Indiana
1977 establishments in Indiana